Forest Hill is a district of the London Borough of Lewisham in  south east London, England, on the South Circular Road, which is home to the Horniman Museum.

History 

Like much of Greater London, Forest Hill was only sparsely populated until the mid-19th century. The name Forest Hill, originally simply "The Forest", referred to the woodland which once covered the area and which was a relict part of the Great North Wood.

In 1809, the Croydon Canal opened, however, the large number of locks (28) meant it was not a commercial success, and it was bought by the London & Croydon Railway Company who used the alignment to construct the London Bridge to Croydon railway line  opening in 1839.  The ponds in the Dacres Wood Nature Reserve and the retaining wall of the footpath opposite the station outside the pub are about the only physical evidence of the canal which still exist.

When the Crystal Palace was moved from Hyde Park to Sydenham in 1854, many large homes were built on the western end of Forest Hill along with Honor Oak. In 1884, London's oldest swimming pool was constructed on Dartmouth Road. The tea merchant Frederick Horniman built a museum to house his collection of natural history artifacts. He donated the building and its gardens to the public in 1901 and this became the Horniman Museum.

Local area

Amenities 

Horniman Museum is home to anthropological and cultural collections, an aquarium and one of the most varied collections of taxidermy in the northern hemisphere. It also houses one of the finest collection of musical instruments in the British Isles. Contained within its accompanying gardens is an animal enclosure, flower gardens, and a Grade II listed early 20th century conservatory. Views from the gardens stretch out over central and north London.

Following a successful and widely supported campaign from local group Save The Face Of Forest Hill, Louise House was designated a Grade II listed building by English Heritage.

Forest Hill Library was built in 1901 to an Arts and Crafts design by local architect Alexander Hennell. It is one of over 500 Grade II listed buildings in Lewisham Borough. It was refurbished in 2008.

Recreation 
A few parks are located and around in Forest Hill. Horniman Triangle Park is located directly opposite Horniman Museum and Gardens, with Tarleton Gardens close by. Blythe Hill is located on the border with Catford, while in Sydenham, Baxter Field, Mayow Park and Sydenham Hill Woods are located on the border with Forest Hill.

Alongside Sydenham Hill Woods, is the Dulwich and Sydenham Golf course, dating back to 1893. There are three nature reserves in Forest Hill: Dacres Wood, Devonshire Road and Garthorne Road. Dacres Wood Nature Reserve is open on the last Saturday of each month and Devonshire Road Nature Reserve on the last Sunday of the month.

Architecture 
With a range of architectural styles spanning the late 19th and 20th centuries, Forest Hill was described by Sir Norman Foster as "a delightful pocket of South London". Of particular note are the Capitol Cinema (now a JD Wetherspoon pub), the Horniman Museum, and classic art deco mansion blocks Forest Croft and Taymount Grange.

Education 
There are nine primary schools in SE23 (Dalmain, Fairlawn, Holy Trinity, Horniman, Kilmorie, Perrymount, St George's, St William of York), one specialist through school (Brent Knoll) and one secondary school (Forest Hill School for boys). Eliot Bank primary and Sydenham School (for girls) is close by in Upper Sydenham. There are no private schools in Forest Hill; however, Dulwich College, James Allen's Girls, St Dunstans and Sydenham High are in surrounding areas. Furthermore, there are no colleges in Forest Hill; however, Forest Hill and Sydenham schools have a joint sixth form.

Gallery

Notable residents 

Home decor personality Linda Barker
Dame Doris Beale, Matron-in-Chief of Queen Alexandra's Royal Naval Nursing Service for three years during the Second World War was born in Forest Hill on 9 August 1889.
Dietrich Bonhoeffer (1906–1945), the German Protestant theologian and Christian martyr killed by the Nazis, briefly lived and preached in Forest Hill.
A. C. Bouquet (1884-1976), academic, theologian and writer born in Forest Hill
Raymond Chandler, mystery and thriller writer, author of The Long Goodbye and The Big Sleep. Born in the US, but educated at Dulwich College. Probably lived with his mother at 148 (now 138) Devonshire Road, Forest Hill from 1909 until he returned to America in 1912.
Andy Coulson, editor, News of the World, 2003–07; Director of Communications, Conservative Party, 2007–11.
Ernest Dowson, poet
Desmond Dekker lived in Devonshire Road, more towards Honor Oak.
Irish-born television, film and stage actor Michael Gambon, famous for portrayal of Albus Dumbledore in the Harry Potter movie franchise lived at Forest Croft in Forest Hill in the early to mid-1960s.
Henry Charles Fehr (1867–1940), sculptor, was born in Forest Hill
Denis Gifford, historian of film, comics, radio and television, was born in Forest Hill.
Sir Isaac Hayward, politician
Vince Hilaire, one of the first black players to establish himself in English football was born in Forest Hill on 10 October 1959 and went on to have a distinguished career with local club Crystal Palace.
Tea merchant Frederick John Horniman (1835–1906) lived in Forest Hill. A keen traveller, he accumulated a large collection of items relating to local cultures and natural history. This became so large that he built a special museum for it, donated to the public in 1901.
British film actor Leslie Howard (1893–1943) was born in Forest Hill on 3 April 1893
Craig Fairbrass, actor, lives in Forest Hill
Tanya Franks, actress
David Jones, painter & poet
Hollywood actor Boris Karloff was a resident of Forest Hill Road, Honor Oak.
Lionel Jeffries, actor and film director, was born in Forest Hill.
Tom Keating the famous forger lived in Forest Hill.
Don Letts, filmmaker and musician
Singer Millie lived in Forest Hill at the time of her major hit My Boy Lollipop
Joan Morgan, actresss, playwright, novelist, born 1905
William Page (1861–1934), historian and editor, lived here 1886–96
Mica Paris, singer/songwriter
John Parris of Parris Cues world-renowned cue maker.
Peter Perrett, of The Only Ones, in its 1970s musical heyday.
Henry Price CBE was a Conservative politician who represented Lewisham West between 1950 and 1964.  He founded the "Middle-Class Alliance" and in 1954, London County Council sought a compulsory purchase order for his home in Forest Hill to build council housing.
Luke Pritchard, lead singer of The Kooks, was born in Forest Hill
Aaron Renfree dancer and former singer
Iwan Rheon, singer-songwriter and actor, formerly of the E4 series Misfits.
Arthur Rhys-Davids, World War I ace fighter pilot was born in Forest Hill
Musician Francis Rossi, lead singer and guitarist of Status Quo, was born in Forest Hill on 29 May 1949
Mary Patricia Shepherd, thoracic surgeon, was born in Forest Hill
Actor Timothy Spall was a resident of Honor Oak.
Gavin Stamp, architectural critic
Doris Stokes, medium
Broadcaster, journalist and cricketer E. W. Swanton was born in Forest Hill on 11 February 1907
James Todd, cricketer
Jackie Trent the singer/songwriter lived in Forest Hill when she first had success in the 1960s
Hayley Squires actress and playwright, known for Call The Midwife and Adult Material was born in Forest Hill on 16 April 1988

Transport 

Forest Hill railway station is located on the South Circular Road (A205), and is served by frequent London Overground and Southern trains to London Bridge, London Victoria, Croydon, Caterham,  and Highbury & Islington. Forest Hill is also served by a number of bus routes: 75, 122, 176, 185, 197, 356, 363, N63 and P4.

Nearest places

References

External links 

Districts of the London Borough of Lewisham
Areas of London
District centres of London